Noonvares is a hamlet in the parish of Crowan, Cornwall, England.

References

Hamlets in Cornwall